The 1903 St. Xavier Musketeers football team was an American football team that represented St. Xavier College (later renamed Xavier University) during the 1903 college football season. The team compiled a 7–3 record, shut out seven of ten opponents, and outscored all opponents by a total of 121 to 63.

Schedule

References

St. Xavier
Xavier Musketeers football seasons
St. Xavier Saints football